Tiaan Tauakipulu (born in New Zealand) is an Australian rugby union player who plays for the  in Super Rugby. His playing position is prop. He was named in the Waratahs elite development squad for the Super Rugby competition in 2020.

Reference list

External links
Rugby.com.au profile
itsrugby.co.uk profile

Australian rugby union players
Living people
Rugby union props
Year of birth missing (living people)
New South Wales Waratahs players
Rugby union players from Auckland